Anton Freiherr von Eiselsberg (31 July 1860 – 25 October 1939) was an Austrian neurosurgeon.

A student of Theodor Billroth, Eiselsberg served as professor of medicine at Utrecht University and at University of Königsberg before being appointed head of the First Department of Surgery at the University of Vienna. He was one of the founders of neurosurgery, co-founder of the Austrian Cancer Society in 1910, and an honorary member of the Austrian Academy of Sciences. It was his initiative that lead to the creation of the world-first emergency surgery station in Vienna, dramatically increasing the effectiveness of medical intervention after accidents.

In 1907 Eiselsberg performed the first successful removal of a spinal cord tumor.  Operating with only crude X-rays, he actually located the tumor primarily on the basis of the symptoms of the patient.

Eiselsberg was awarded the second Lister Medal in 1927 for his contributions to surgical science. As part of the award, he was invited to give the Lister Memorial Lecture at the Royal College of Surgeons of England in July 1927.

He himself died during the early days of World War II in an accident caused by the collision of two trains in the vicinity of St. Valentin, Lower Austria, on 25 October 1939.

He was one of the greatest surgeons, teachers and clinical researchers of his time. Billroth described him as "my best student." In 1909 he founded, along with Julius Hochenegg the world's first model emergency rooms. Eiselsberg and Hochenegg are considered "fathers of the emergency rooms" (ER).

Publications
 Die Werkstatt des Chirurgen. 1912.
 Die Hypophyse. Vienna, 1930.
 Lebensweg eines Chirurgen. Vienna, Tyrolia, 1938.

Decorations and awards
 1903: Councillor
 1905: Honorary Membership of the Royal College of Surgeons of Edinburgh
 1927: Lister Medal (awarded as the second prize winner) of the Royal College of Surgeons of England
 1931: Honorary citizen of the City of Vienna
 1932: Honorary Member of the Austrian Academy of Sciences
 1932: Austrian Cross of Honour for Science and Art, 1st class
 Seven honorary doctorates
 Komturkreuzes of the Austrian Order of Merit

Notes

References

External links 

 
 aeiou.at
 Article on Eiselsberg in Ärztewoche
 Austrian Cancer Society
 Van-Swieten Society

1860 births
1939 deaths
People from Wels-Land District
Austrian surgeons
Austrian neurosurgeons
Barons of Austria
Academic staff of the University of Königsberg
Academic staff of the University of Vienna
Austrian expatriates in Germany
19th-century Austrian people
20th-century Austrian people
Members of the Austrian Academy of Sciences
Recipients of the Austrian Cross of Honour for Science and Art, 1st class
Members of the Royal Society of Sciences in Uppsala